John Hosking may refer to:

 John Hosking (judge) (1854–1928), New Zealand judge
 John Hosking (politician) (1805–1882), politician and merchant in colonial Australia

See also 
 John Hoskin (1921–1990), British sculptor
 John Hoskins (disambiguation)